Abernant railway station served the village of Abernant in Wales. Served by the Vale of Neath railway, the station lay at the other end of the 2497 yard Abernant Tunnel from Merthyr Tydfil.

History

The station was opened by the Vale of Neath Railway in November 1854. It was designed by Isambard Kingdom Brunel as a single Broad Gauge line with a third rail added later to allow mixed gauge traffic It became part of the Great Western Railway in 1865.

By the late 19th Century, the line was described as the ‘most antiquated line’ of the GWR. It was quite a distance from ‘Aberdare’ that either required a long steep climb or hiring a cab. It was described as picturesque and convenient, it was unloved. The chairman of the local Board of Health said that due to the lack of facilities, it was a disgrace. He noted that over 300,000 passengers a year used it but there was no accommodation or toilets. Further pressure was added in June 1896 when a local newspaper suggested it be moved to the Cardiff Exhibition. As a result, facilities were improved in 1897.

The line then passed on to the Western Region of British Railways on nationalisation in 1948. The station was then closed by the British Railways Board in 1962.

The site today

The platform remains on the now overgrown site.

The British Railways Western Region station sign is now on display at the Cynon Valley Museum, Aberdare.

References 

 Abernant station in 1962 
 Abernant station on navigable O. S. map

Disused railway stations in Rhondda Cynon Taf
Former Great Western Railway stations
Railway stations in Great Britain opened in 1854
Railway stations in Great Britain closed in 1962
1854 establishments in Wales